Barbados competed at the 2020 Summer Paralympics in Tokyo, Japan, from 24 August to 5 September 2021. This was their fifth overall appearance at the Summer Paralympics.

Competitors
The following is the list of number of competitors participating in the Games:

Swimming 
DNA: Did not advance
Men

See also 
 Barbados at the Paralympics
 Barbados at the 2020 Summer Olympics

External links 
 2020 Summer Paralympics website

Nations at the 2020 Summer Paralympics
2020
Summer Paralympics